The Journal of Sex & Marital Therapy is a peer-reviewed scientific journal published by Routledge and formerly by Brunner/Mazel. Its editor-in-chief is R. Taylor Segraves.

Scope 

The Journal of Sex & Marital Therapy covers:

 Sexual Dysfunctions—ranging from dyspareunia to autogynephilia to pedophilia
 Therapeutic Techniques—including psychopharmacology and sexual counseling for a wide range of dysfunctions
 Clinical Considerations—sexual dysfunction and its relationship to aging, unemployment, alcoholism, and more 
 Theoretical Issues—such as the ethics of pornography in the AIDS era 
 Marital Relationships—including psychological intimacy and marital stability in women abused as children.

External links 
 

Publications established in 1975
Sexology journals
Taylor & Francis academic journals
English-language journals
5 times per year journals